KGTF, virtual and VHF digital channel 12, is a Public Broadcasting Service (PBS) member television station serving the U.S. territory of Guam that is licensed to Hagåtña. The station is owned by the Guam Educational Telecommunications Corporation, an agency of the territorial government. KGTF's studios are located in Mangilao, adjacent to Guam Community College, and its transmitter is located on Mount Barrigada in Barrigada. KGTF currently operates from 6 a.m. to midnight seven days a week.

History

The station signed on the air on October 30, 1970, with only 4½ hours of programming Monday through Friday, of which they would later expand throughout its 50-year history, including producing local shows and various projects. Original materials from PBS Guam have been contributed to the American Archive of Public Broadcasting. PBS Guam received PBS' overhaul branding in late-November 2019.

Digital channels
The station's digital signal is multiplexed:

See also
Channel 12 digital TV stations in the United States
Channel 12 virtual TV stations in the United States

References

External links

GTF
PBS member stations
Television channels and stations established in 1970
1970 establishments in Guam
Hagåtña, Guam
Public broadcasting in insular areas of the United States